Andrew Scott (born 22 December 1969 in Adelaide, South Australia) is an Australian baseball player. He represented Australia at the 1996 Summer Olympics.

References

1969 births
Olympic baseball players of Australia
Australian baseball players
Baseball players at the 1996 Summer Olympics
Living people
Sportspeople from Adelaide